The Rogers–Downing House is a historic house in Andover, Massachusetts.  It was built between 1848 and 1852 as the country house for Benjamin Rogers, a wealthy Boston businessman.  After Rogers sold it in 1870, it went through a succession of owners before coming into the hands of John Downing, who established a dairy farm and orchard on the estate.  Their family retained the house until 1968.  The house is an unusual example of a Gothic Revival summer house.  Its shape is that of an H, with two -story wings connected by a -story connecting section.  The gable ends of the side wings face the street, as do two gable dormers on the cross section.  These are decorated with bargeboard trim, a typical Gothic Revival detail.  The house sits prominently on a rise above Highland Road.

The house was listed on the National Register of Historic Places in 1982.

See also
National Register of Historic Places listings in Andover, Massachusetts
National Register of Historic Places listings in Essex County, Massachusetts

References

Houses in Andover, Massachusetts
National Register of Historic Places in Andover, Massachusetts
Houses on the National Register of Historic Places in Essex County, Massachusetts